"The Drowners" is the debut single of English rock band Suede, released on 11 May 1992 on Nude Records. It was later included on the band's debut album, Suede (1993). "The Drowners" charted at number 49 on the UK Singles Chart.

Background
Though not a hit at first, it amassed airplay over time and has become one of the band's definitive singles. Two different videos were produced for the song, one on rotation in the UK and the other created for the American market. The cover art features a seventies photo of German model Veruschka body-painted with a man's suit.

Legacy
In a retrospective review of the song, Troy Carpenter of AllMusic wrote: "'The Drowners' itself is a raucous anthem, lassoed by Bernard Butler's punctuated guitar riff. Singer Brett Anderson's ambiguous lyrics ("We kiss in his room/to a popular tune") and high-pitched croon recall Bowie's most theatrical moments, but in a different musical setting." It garnered much acclaim from NME and Melody Maker, who both voted the song single of the year.

In 2014, NME ranked the song at number 104 in its list of the 500 Greatest Songs of All Time. "The Drowners" was placed at number 40 in a 2016 poll of "The 100 Greatest Alternative Singles of the '90s" by music site PopMatters.

Cover versions
The song was covered by Bristol space rock band Flying Saucer Attack. B-side "My Insatiable One", was covered by Morrissey during his 1992 world tour. The song was covered in concert by the Manic Street Preachers. Bernard Butler played two songs at the same gig but contrary to many reports did not join them for The Drowners – a recording was released as a B-side to their single "She Is Suffering" in late 1994.

Track listings
All songs were written by Brett Anderson and Bernard Butler.

7-inch vinyl
 "The Drowners"
 "To The Birds"

12-inch vinyl, CD
 "The Drowners"
 "To the Birds"
 "My Insatiable One"

CD (1993 US release)
 "The Drowners"
 "My Insatiable One"
 "To the Birds"
 "The Big Time"
 "He's Dead" (live at Glastonbury June 1993)

Charts

References

External links
 

Suede (band) songs
1992 debut singles
1992 songs
Music videos directed by Lindy Heymann
Song recordings produced by Ed Buller
Songs written by Bernard Butler
Songs written by Brett Anderson